Cedar Grove is an unincorporated area and census-designated place in Bay County, Florida, United States. It was formerly an incorporated town, but it was dissolved in 2008 after a vote by residents.  The town had 90 days from October 3, 2008, to implement the dissolution ordinance and hand over all operations to organs of the county government.  This was the first time in Florida history that a town was disincorporated by a vote of its citizens. The dissolution ordinance took effect at 8:00 AM on October 22, 2008, at which time the police department was disbanded and all assets became the property of the Bay County Commission. The current census-designated place had a population of 3,397 at the 2010 census. It is part of the Panama City–Lynn Haven–Panama City Beach Metropolitan Statistical Area.

Geography
Cedar Grove is located at  (30.212219, -85.606028).

Demographics

As of the census of 2000, there were 5,367 people, 2,109 households, and 1,423 families residing in the town. The racial makeup of the town was 85.47% White, 9.60% African American, 0.73% Native American, 1.77% Asian, 0.09% Pacific Islander, 0.56% from other races, and 1.79% from two or more races. Hispanic or Latino of any race were 2.11% of the population.

There were 2,109 households, out of which 34.6% had children under the age of 18 living with them, 46.7% were married couples living together, 16.2% had a female householder with no husband present, and 32.5% were non-families. 26.4% of all households were made up of individuals, and 7.4% had someone living alone who was 65 years of age or older.  The average household size was 2.49 and the average family size was 3.00.

In the town the population was spread out, with 27.2% under the age of 18, 9.9% from 18 to 24, 29.4% from 25 to 44, 20.7% from 45 to 64, and 12.9% who were 65 years of age or older.  The median age was 34 years. For every 100 females, there were 92.4 males.  For every 100 females age 18 and over, there were 87.3 males.

The median income for a household in the town was $28,762, and the median income for a family was $31,577. Males had a median income of $25,203 versus $18,250 for females. The per capita income for the town was $13,588.  About 16.1% of families and 19.0% of the population were below the poverty line, including 29.8% of those under age 18 and 7.1% of those age 65 or over.

References

Census-designated places in Bay County, Florida
Populated places established in 1951
2008 disestablishments in Florida
Former municipalities in Florida
Census-designated places in Florida
Populated places disestablished in 2008